Karen Sentíes (born Karen Mireya Sentíes Ludwik on December 10, 1965, in Mexico City, Distrito Federal, Mexico) is a Mexican telenovela actress who is known for playing in Spanish language telenovelas on Televisa and TV Azteca and in one Canadian television series on the CBC.

Telenovelas

Eva la Trailera (Telemundo) - Carmen Soler 
En Otra Piel (Telemundo) - Lorena Serrano
Los Rey (Azteca) - Andrea Loperena de Rey
Una Maid en Manhattan (Telemundo) - Amelia Parker Salas
Aurora (Telemundo) - Inés Ponce de Leon
Pobre Diabla (TV Azteca) - Chimirra
Amor Comprado (Venevision) - Leonora
Olvidarte Jamás (Venevision) - Gladys Montero
Un Nuevo Amor (TV Azteca) - Valentina Méndez (lead)
Tres veces Sofia (TV Azteca)
Rivales por accidente (TV Azteca) 
Magica Juventud
Simplemente María (Televisa) - Silvia Rebollar

External links
Karen Sentíes Biography for Karen Sentíes

1965 births
Mexican telenovela actresses
Mexican television actresses
Living people
20th-century Mexican actresses
21st-century Mexican actresses